Stillwater State Forest is a state forest located in Montana. The forest has an area of approximately 90,000 acres and is one of the seven state forests in Montana.

The forest was designated as a state forest in 1925 through a law passed by the Montana Legislature.

See also 
 List of forests in Montana

References 

Montana state forests